Sea Eye 4 is an offshore supply ship that is used as a sea rescue ship. The Sea-Eye organisation moved the ship to the Mediterranean Sea in 2021 to rescue refugees.

History
The ship was built under, construction number 296, at Scheepswerf Pattje in Waterhuizen, Netherlands, for the Norwegian shipping company Norway Supply Ships in Stavanger as an offshore supplier. It was launched as the West Eagle. In 1981 the ship was sold to Arvid Bergvall Jr. & Co., registered in Panama and renamed Springfield. In 1982 the ship went to the Dutch shipping company Vroon, which renamed it Oil Express. In 2011, Eagle Shipping bought the ship and renamed it ESL Express. The following year the ship went to Wind Express Shipping. The new name was Wind Express.

In October 2020, the ship was sold again and converted by the Sea-Eye organisation into a sea rescue ship to accommodate boat refugees. Among other things, an infirmary and two rescue boats that can be launched using cranes were retrofitted.  had started a donation campaign on wirschickennocheinschiff.de for the purchase of the ship. More than 660 large and small organisations, initiatives, companies, associations and foundations from different areas of society came together in the alliance. Among other things, the alliance is supported by the German Trade Union Confederation (DGB), World Vision Germany, the Coordinating Council of Muslims and the Evangelical Church in Germany.  The cost of buying and converting the ship and transferring it to the Mediterranean amounted to around one million euros.

With the ship renamed Sea-Eye 4, the organisation replaced the much smaller rescue ship Alan Kurdi, which it passed on to the Spanish organisation Proem-Aid. On 8 May 2021, Sea-Eye 4 began its operation from the Spanish port in Burriana to rescue migrants in need in the Mediterranean. The mission is supported by United4Rescue (alliance for civil sea rescue) and the aid organisation German Doctors for Developing Countries.

References 

Sea rescue organizations
European migrant crisis
Immigrant rights activism
Humanitarian aid organizations in Europe
Refugee aid organizations in Europe